The 2016 Philadelphia Union season was the seventh season of the Philadelphia Union in Major League Soccer, the top flight of American soccer. The team was managed by Jim Curtin, his third season with the club. The 2016 season marked the Union's second appearance in the MLS Cup Playoffs, the first time since the 2011 season.

Background

2016 MLS SuperDraft

2015 MLS regular season
The 2015 Philadelphia Union MLS regular season saw the team go 10–17–7, finishing 9th in the Eastern Conference and 18th overall. From the beginning of the season to the summer break, the Union went 4-9-3, including a four-game losing streak from April 19 to May 9. After the summer break, the Union fared only slightly better, going 6-8-4. The Union missed the MLS Cup Playoffs for the 4th consecutive season.

2015 U.S. Open Cup
The 2015 U.S. Open Cup was the second year in a row in which the Union were runners-up in the U.S. Open Cup. The Union entered the competition in the fourth round along with the other 16 US-based MLS clubs. In that round, the Union defeated the Rochester Rhinos, a team in the USL, the third tier of the American soccer pyramid, 3-1 on penalty kicks after a 0-0 draw through extra time. In the next round, the Union defeated D.C. United 2-1. The Union then went on to defeat the New York Red Bulls 4-3 on penalty kicks, after a 1-1 draw aet. In the semifinals, the Union beat the Chicago Fire 1-0. In the final, the Union lost to Sporting Kansas City 6-7 on penalties, after going 1-1.

2016 roster
As of January 24, 2016.

Squad breakdown

Current squad

DP indicates Designated Player
GA indicates Generation Adidas Player
HGP indicates Home Grown Player
INT indicates MLS International Player and qualifies for an international roster spot

Competitions

Preseason

MLS season

MLS Cup playoffs

Statistics

Statistics are from all MLS league matches as documented by MLSsoccer.com.

Players with names marked  left the club during the playing season.
Players with names in italics were loaned players.

Goalkeepers

Record = W-L-D

Standings

Eastern Conference standings

Overall standings

U.S. Open Cup

Friendlies

Transfers

In

Out

Loan in

Loan out

Honors and awards

MLS Player of the Week

MLS Goal of the Week

MLS Save of the Week

MLS All-Stars 2016

End of Season Awards

References

Philadelphia Union seasons
Philadelphia Union
Philadelphia Union
Philadelphia Union